The Olympus FE-340 is a compact digital camera made by Olympus Corporation for still and video photography. It was released in February 2008.

Specifications
Compression
 Fine and Normal compression settings

Lens
 6.3 – 31.5mm (36 – 180mm equivalent in 35mm photography)

Zoom
 5x optical zoom
 4x digital zoom

Normal focus range
 15.7" (40 cm) to infinity

Macro focus range
 1.2" (3 cm) to infinity

Exposure adjustment range (EV)
 +/- 2.0EV in 0.3EV steps

Metering modes
 Digital ESP AE, face detection AE with face detection AF

Image sensor
 8 Megapixels (effective)
 1/2.35" CCD (1.08 cm)

Aspect ratio
 4:3 and 16:9

Display
 2.7" (6.9 cm) TFT colour LCD
 230,000 dots; 2 steps Brightness Adjustment

Memory
 48MB Internal Memory
 Expandable to 2GB with a xD-Picture Card

ISO sensitivity
 Auto, 64, 100, 200, 400, 800, 1600, and 3200 (equivalent)

Self timer
 12 seconds

Flash modes
 Auto, Red-Eye Reduction, Fill-In, Off

Flash range description
 Wide: 0.33 - 12.8 feet (0.1 - 3.9m); Tele: 2.0 - 7.9 feet (0.6 - 2.4m) at ISO 800

Movie resolution
 640 x 480 VGA and 320 x 240 QVGA

Movie frame rate
 15 and 30 frames per second (fps)

Movie file format
 AVI Motion JPEG

See also
 Gallery of images taken by the FE-340 in Wikicommons

External links
 Olympus FE-340 Product Support
 American Olympus Corporation Website.
 Global web portal for Olympus Corporation.
 Olympus FE-340 review and specifications.

References
 FE-340/X-855/C-560 Instruction Manual, including specifications.

FE-340
Cameras introduced in 2008